Merchantrade Asia (Merchantrade) is a Money Services Business (MSB), Digital Payment Service (Issuing and Acquiring) and Mobile Virtual Network operator (MVNO) provider, based in Malaysia.

The company’s core business is centered on international money transfers, foreign currency exchange, wholesale banknotes, digital payment processing and mobile telecommunications. They recently introduced micro insurance as part of their service offerings.

Merchantrade Asia operates 96 outlets, 2 main wholesale banknote trading hubs and more than 600 agent locations throughout Malaysia.

History 

 1996 - Founded as a telecommunications equipment supplier in Malaysia.
 2003 - Offers discount telephone cards, Voice-over-IP (VOIP) and call shops.
 2007 - Offers Merchantrade Mobile a mobile virtual network operator (MVNO) with Celcom Axiata Berhad. 
 2007 - Offers Merchantrade Express Remittances with a Money Transfer Operator license in Malaysia.
 2009 - Obtained investment from Sumitomo Corporation (Japan).
2011 - Offers Merchantrade eRemit online money transfer web portal
 2012 - Obtained Class A Money Services Business (MSB) license.
 2012 - Offers foreign currency exchange business & an agent network.
 2012 - Offers Merchantrade Doowit a mobile remittance platform.
 2013 - Formed partnership for global money transfer network service with MoneyGram.
2014 - Obtained investment from Celcom Axiata Berhad.
2015 - Obtained Class D Money Services Business (MSB) license.
2015 - Offers Merchantrade eForex online currency exchange web portal.
2015 - Offers Merchantrade wholesale currency banknotes services.
2015 - Formed a joint venture Celcopon (Malaysia).
 2015 - Offers Merchantrade eRemit Mobile App online remittance service on iOS & Android.
 2017 - Acquired 100% stake in Vital Rate Sdn. Bhd. Notable currency exchange outlets in Pavilion, Suria KLCC, KL Sentral.
 2017 - Acquired TG Solutions (Malaysia) and re-branded to 8Square Infotrans (Malaysia).
 2017 - Formed a joint venture Jetixa (Dubai).
2018 - Offers Merchantrade Money multi-currency e-wallet with a VISA accepted prepaid card.
2018 - Received Florin Asia Innovation Awards.
2018 - Offers Merchantrade Insure, micro insurance services.
2018 - Acquire 49% stake in Kliq Pte Ltd, Singapore, operator of M1Remit, Singapore (money transfer on mobile app).
2019 - Received RemTECH Award 
2019 - Awarded as Visa's Most Outstanding Launch - Innovation Products Award, and Malaysia Technology Excellence Award.
2019 - Formed partnership for global money transfer network service with Western Union.
2020 - Offers Merchantrade Ozopay, a payment gateway service.
2020 - Formed partnership for money transfers to China with Ant Group - Alipay
2020 - Increased stake to 70% in Kliq Pte Ltd, Singapore  and re-branded M1Remit money transfer app to eRemit Singapore.
2020 - Acquired 100% stake in Malaysian mobile financial services business Valyou Sdn. Bhd.  Subsequently, increased its outlets to 101 locations in Malaysia.
2020 - Obtained investment from Kenanga Investment Bank. Partners to offer Kenanga Money eWallet 
2021 - Partnerships with AmBank to launch Hybrid Wallet, IDEMIA for Digital Onboarding, and LintraMax to provide cashless ecosystem at plantations

Services

Money Services Business (MSB) 

The company offers international remittance services, currency exchange and wholesale banknote services as part of its money services business segment. The company is also a member of the Malaysian Association of Money Services Business (MAMSB) and International Association of Money Transfer Networks (IAMTN).

International Money Transfer 
Merchantrade has branches throughout Malaysia and an online money transfer portal that offers money transfer services to major countries like USA, Australia, New Zealand, Canada, India, Bangladesh, Nepal, Indonesia and more. Their services are mainly used by parents sending money to their children studying overseas, expats in Malaysia sending money to their families back home and small to medium businesses transferring funds to suppliers and vendors in other countries.

Foreign Currency Exchange 
Merchantrade also offers retail and online currency exchange services. Some of the key outlets are located in high end malls in Kuala Lumpur, such as Pavilion, Suria KLCC and Imago, Kota Kinabalu.

Payments (e-money issuer) 
A non-bank issuer of multi-currency e-wallet with a VISA accepted prepaid card in Malaysia. The e-wallet is able to exchange directly into 20 foreign currencies and make payments directly with the card. Within the e-wallet, users may transfer funds, track expenses, make retail payments in different currencies, reload international & Malaysian prepaid mobile sim accounts as well as withdraw foreign cash from ATM around the world.

Mobile Virtual Network Operator 
A mobile virtual network operator (MVNO), through a partnership with Celcom Axiata to offer International mobile direct dial (IDD), high speed 4G LTE mobile internet and international airtime credit transfer.

Products

Money Services Business 

 Merchantrade Money Transfer. (international money transfer service)
 Merchantrade Money Exchange. (foreign currency exchange)
 Merchantrade eRemit Malaysia & eRemit Singapore (online money transfer platform & mobile app).
 Merchantrade eForex (online currency exchange mobile app).
 Merchantrade Wholesale Currency Banknotes Services. (wholesale currency bank note service)
Merchantrade Valyou (online money transfer mobile app )
Merchantrade International Money Transfer Operator (payment delivery aggregator).

Mobile 

 MVNO Hello Sim (Mobile Prepaid Cellular line )

Payments (e-money issuer) 

 Merchantrade Money (e-wallet mobile app with a multi-currency Visa prepaid card) 
 Merchantrade Ozopay ( digital payment gateway)

Insurance 

 Merchantrade Insure
 Merchantrade Insure Life
 Merchantrade Insure Basic
 Merchantrade Insure Xtra
 Merchantrade Insure Partners
 AXA Affin General Insurance Berhad
 MCIS Insurance Berhad (MCIS Life)

Institutional Shareholders 

 Celcom Axiata Bhd
 Sumitomo Corporation (Japan) 
Kenanga Investment Bank
MCIS Insurance Berhad (MCIS Life)

Subsidiaries 

 8 Square Infotrans - 8squarei 
 Kliq Pte. Ltd. - eRemit Singapore
 Celcopon Sdn. Bhd. - MCoopon
 Valyou Sdn. Bhd. - Valyou

References 

1996 establishments in Malaysia
Remittances
Foreign exchange companies
Financial services companies of Malaysia
Malaysian companies established in 1996
Telecommunications companies of Malaysia
Payments
Cashless society